Cabaret is a 2019 Indian romantic drama thriller dance film directed by Kaustav Narayan Niyogi, produced by Pooja Bhatt and Bhushan Kumar under the banner of Fisheye Network private limited. Principal photography of the film began around 9 June 2015. Originally scheduled for a 2016 release, alleged copyright violations led to delays before its eventual release on 9 January 2019. It was released on the ZEE5 on 9 January 2019.

Plot summary

Cast
 Richa Chadda as Rajeshsri / Roza
 Gulshan Devaiah as Gaurav
 S. Sreesanth as Chetta Don aka Nand Shah
 Gulshan Grover as Salim
 Vipin Sharma as Police Inspector
 Akshay Anand as Victor (Roza's manager)
 Sharad Kapoor as Vikram Batwal (Ex-IB Officer)
 Manoj Pahwa as Newspaper owner
 Jyothi Rana as Meera (Roza's friend)
 Rajat Kaul as Nawaab
 Sujata Sanghamitra as Neena (Gaurav's boss)
 Rahul Roy as Actor in 'Paani Paani' song

Soundtrack
The soundtrack of the film is composed by Kaustav Narayan Niyogi and Munish Makhija except for the song "Phir Teri Bahon Mein", which is composed by Tony Kakkar. The soundtrack consists of 6 songs. The background music is composed by Bapi Tutul.

References

External links
 
 

Indian dance films
Films shot in Mumbai
2019 films
T-Series (company) films
ZEE5 original films
2010s biographical films
2019 direct-to-video films